Hazel Grove and Bramhall are towns in the Metropolitan Borough of Stockport, Greater Manchester, England.  The towns, together with the village of Woodford, contain 28 listed buildings that are recorded in the National Heritage List for England.  Of these, one is listed at Grade I, the highest of the three grades, one is at Grade II*, the middle grade, and the others are at Grade II, the lowest grade.  Most of the listed buildings are houses and associated structures, farmhouses and farm buildings.  The other listed buildings include churches and lych gates, and a war memorial.


Key

Buildings

References

Citations

Sources

Lists of listed buildings in Greater Manchester
Buildings and structures in the Metropolitan Borough of Stockport